Bays is an unincorporated community in Breathitt County, Kentucky. Bays had a post office from March 30, 1898, to January 3, 2004; it still has its own ZIP code, 41310.

References

Unincorporated communities in Breathitt County, Kentucky
Unincorporated communities in Kentucky